The Masses Are Asses is a quote attributed to Alexander Hamilton and may refer to:

A 1974 play by Pedro Pietri
A 1997 song by the female punk rock group L7 from the album The Beauty Process: Triple Platinum